Andreas Vinciguerra was the defending champion but lost in the final 6–3, 6–4 against Tim Henman.

Seeds
A champion seed is indicated in bold text while text in italics indicates the round in which that seed was eliminated.

  Tim Henman (champion)
  Vladimir Voltchkov (first round)
  Andrew Ilie (second round)
  Andreas Vinciguerra (final)
  Jonas Björkman (first round)
  Rainer Schüttler (second round)
  Bohdan Ulihrach (quarterfinals)
  Jiří Novák (first round)

Draw

External links
 2001 Copenhagen Open draw

2001 Copenhagen Open – 1
2001 ATP Tour